The white-spotted lantern fish (Diaphus rafinesquii), also called Rafinesque's lanternfish, is a species of fish in the family Myctophidae.

Etymology
Its specific name refers to the polymath Constantine Samuel Rafinesque (1783–1840).

Description

Habitat

Behaviour

Males are slightly larger; spawning is in autumn and winter.

References

Myctophidae
Fish described in 1838
Taxa named by Anastasio Cocco